BNML may refer to:
League of Dutch Marxist-Leninists
Burlington Northern (Manitoba) Ltd.